The following is a timeline of the history of the city of Tallahassee, Florida, U.S.

19th century

 1824
 U.S. Territory of Florida capital relocated from Pensacola to newly founded Tallahassee.
 November 8: Legislative Council of the Territory of Florida convenes.
 Tallahassee designated seat of newly created Leon County.
 1825 - City of Tallahassee incorporated.
 1826 - Florida State Capitol building construction begins.
 1826 - City council holds first council elections (mayor & councilmen elected); municipal government of the City of Tallahassee begins operations
 1829 - City Cemetery in use.
 1831 - Williams House built.
 1832 - First Presbyterian Church established.
 1834 - Tallahassee-St. Marks railroad built.
 1835 - Columns house built.
 1837 - Goodwood Plantation established near Tallahassee.
 1840 - Population: 1,616.
 1841 - Yellow Fever epidemic strikes resulting in many deaths
 1843 - Great Fire strikes and burns much of downtown; Capitol building and county court house survives
 1845
 State Capitol building completed.
 Tallahassee becomes part of the new U.S. state of Florida.
 1846 - Southern Journal newspaper begins publication.
 1851 - Florida State College for Women founded.
 1865
 March 6: Battle of Natural Bridge fought near Tallahassee during American Civil War; Union forces defeated.
 "Convention in Tallahassee repealed Florida's secession ordinance; abolished slavery."
 1881 - St. John's Episcopal Church rebuilt.
 1887 - State Normal College for Colored Students opens.
 1899 - February: Great Blizzard of 1899.
 1900 - Population: 2,981.

20th century

 1904 - Florida Christian Advocate newspaper in publication.
 1905
 Weekly True Democrat newspaper begins publication.
 Population: 3,311.
 1907 - Florida Governor's Mansion built.
 1909 - Florida Agricultural and Mechanical College for Negroes active.
 1919 - Commission-manager form of government adopted.
 1927 - Government's Martin Building constructed.
 1929 - Dale Mabry Field (airfield) begins operating.
 1930
 Ritz Theatre in business.
 Population: 10,700.
 1933 - Tallahassee Historical Society formed.
 1935 - WTAL radio begins broadcasting.
 1937 - Greenwood Cemetery established.
 1946 - Florida City County Management Association headquartered in Tallahassee (approximate date).
 1947 - Florida State University active.
 1949 - Drive-In Theatre in business.
 1950 - Florida State University College of Business founded.
 1953 - Florida A&M University active.
 1955 - WCTV (television) begins broadcasting.
 1957 - Tallahassee Junior Museum founded.
 1958 - February 13: City gets record snowfall of 3 inches.
 1960 - Population: 48,174.
 1966 - Florida State University College of Law founded.
 1970 - Historic Tallahassee Preservation Board organized.
 1972 - Florida Association of City Clerks headquartered in Tallahassee (approximate date).
 1973 - Florida State University College of Social Sciences founded.
 1975 - Roman Catholic Diocese of Pensacola–Tallahassee established.
 1977 - Museum of Florida History established.
 1980 - Population: 81,548.
 1981 - Florida Institute of Government headquartered in Tallahassee.
 1982
 Tallahassee Genealogical Society active.
 Florida A&M University – Florida State University College of Engineering founded.
 1983 - 17th-century Mission San Luis de Apalachee Archaeological and Historic Site established.
 1988 - LeRoy Collins Institute of public policy established.
 1989 - Tallahassee Regional Airport begins operating.
 1992 - Knott House museum established.
 1996 - Riley Museum of African American History and Culture established.
 1997 - City website online (approximate date).
 2000 - Florida State University's Local Governance Research Laboratory established.

21st century

 2010 - Population: 181,376.
 2012 - Integrity Florida government watchdog headquartered in city.
 2014 - Andrew Gillum becomes mayor.
 2017 - Neal Dunn becomes U.S. representative for Florida's 2nd congressional district and Al Lawson becomes U.S. representative for Florida's 5th congressional district

See also
 History of Tallahassee, Florida
 List of mayors of Tallahassee, Florida
 National Register of Historic Places listings in Leon County, Florida
 Timelines of other cities in the North Florida area of Florida: Gainesville, Jacksonville, Pensacola

References

Bibliography

  (1978 facsimile ed. by University of Florida)

External links

  (Includes timeline)
 
 Items related to Tallahassee, Florida, various dates (via Digital Public Library of America)

Images

Tallahassee